Countess Adelaide of Vianden (d. 30 September 1376), was a Countess from the House of Vianden, the cadet branch of the House of Sponheim that ruled the County of Vianden, and through marriage Countess of Nassau-Siegen. She acted as regent of the County of Nassau-Siegen for her eldest son in the period 1351–1362.

On the other hand, she also resolved many of the pledges entered into by her husband. In the underdeveloped County of Nassau-Siegen, where the local nobility thought they had a free hand, she kept the reins tight.

Biography
Adelaide was the only daughter of Count Philip II of Vianden and Countess Adelaide of Arnsberg. When and where Adelaide was born is unknown.

Marriage

Adelaide married (marriage contract 23 December 1331) to Count Otto II of Nassau-Siegen ( – between 6 December 1350 and 25 January 1351).

Adelaide and Otto were related. Adelaide’s great-great-grandfather, Count Gerard III of Guelders and Zutphen, was an elder brother of Countess Matilda of Guelders and Zutphen, a great-grandmother of Otto.

Otto succeeded his father in July or August 1343 in Siegerland, the Mark Herborn with Dillenburg and the district of Haiger, as well as Löhnberg. The following year, Otto sold castle and lordship of Löhnberg to Count palatine Rupert I and Count Gerlach I of Nassau.

Otto is not considered to have been a good regent. His short reign was a succession of feuds during which the country was devastated and the sources of prosperity were blocked. To control his expenses, he was forced to pledge possessions frequently and as a result the development of a powerful activity inwardly as well as outwardly was hampered. He was forced to sell the Nassau half of the city of Siegen to the Electorate of Cologne and lost all parts of the  that Nassau had acquired to the County of Sayn. In his last feud, against the brothers Gottfried and Wilderich III , Otto was killed in a battle, that, according to charters, must have taken place between 6 December 1350 and 25 January 1351. As the children were still minors, Adelaide assumed regency over the county.

Regency

Adelaide is considered to have been a good regent. On the other hand, she also resolved many of the pledges entered into by her husband. In the underdeveloped County of Nassau-Siegen, where the local nobility thought they had a free hand, she kept the reins tight. She did have to pledge land to clear her husband’s debts, and although ending her husband’s numerous feuds was not without sacrifice, these agreements brought her the peace for undisturbed reconstruction. The unfinished feuds and frequent interference from the countryʼs resident powerful nobility forced her to make new debts. As early as 1350/51 she had  built as a countermeasure against the new Hessian castle . She had built the castle on allodial land of the lords of Bicken and had the ownership rights to the castle hill known as ‘Murstein’ confirmed in 1352. This way, the feud with Gerlach and Friedrich von Bicken, whose allies were the lords of Wildenburg and Elkershausen, which was highly damaging for both sides, was settled.

Also in 1352, Adelaide succeeded in buying back the former Nassau half of the city of Siegen from the Electorate of Cologne for ʻzwey dusent alte schyldguldenʼ (ʻtwo thousand old shield guildersʼ). And in that year, she reconciled with the Walderdorff brothers, to whom Ottoʼs death seems to have been mainly attributed. With the reconciliation, the Walderdorff brothers had to release the prisoners without ransom, take their goods and tithes in Nassau in fief from the counts and, in addition, provide them with four vassals. Two years later, in 1354, Adolf von Wilmerode, Wilhelm von Hadamar, Rorich Bücher von Lurenburg, Godebracht von Irmtraud and Andreas , as helpers in that feud, also reconciled with Adelaide, under the same condition, that each of them dedicate a part of his hereditary property to Nassau in fief. In 1356, Adelaide was forced to conclude a protection alliance with Landgrave Henry II ʻthe Ironʼ of Hesse, opening all Nassau castles to the landgrave, during her sonʼs minority.

In the district of Haiger, the noble family of the same name had been very powerful from old times. Under the favour of its feudal lords, it resisted the overlordship of the Counts of Nassau. Johnʼs minority seemed to be the most opportune time for it to shake off this yoke completely. Heiderich von Haigerʼs arrogance went so far that he allowed himself to commit abuses against the person of the young John. An open feud ensued, the ruinous consequences of which, as usual, affected the countryside and its inhabitants. Adelaide, however, did not lack courage and steadfastness to counter the insolence and violence of her enemies with vigour and to defend the rights of her son. There is no doubt that she benefited greatly from the support of her allies, Landgrave Henry II ʻthe Ironʼ of Hesse and his son Otto ʻthe Youngerʼ. The conflict with sword and lance was followed by a legal dispute, before a settlement was concluded in 1357 by Count Thierry III of Looz, the chairman of the court, in a decision written in 63 articles, which is a most remarkable explanation of the customs and rights of that age. The pledge of the parish of Haiger and half of Ginsburg Castle was undone. It decided the struggle with the lords of Haiger for supremacy in the Mark Haiger in favour of the Nassaus. The lords of Haiger became vassals of the Nassaus. The beneficial consequences of peace and tranquillity became apparent in the next few years.

From 1359 to 1362, Adelaide and John redeemed the most considerable pledges. Because of 3200 pounds Heller and 2000 shield guilders, which Holy Roman Emperor Charles IV owed the deceased Count Otto, he assigned 1½ old large tornesel from some water or land tolls. Often to such grants this clause was added: ʻwhen he may acquire it at a princeʼs or lordʼs tollsʼ. If an agreement was reached with the owner of the toll, the tollʼs duty was increased in proportion to the sum granted, which, of course, should only have been temporary in accordance with the intention, but which may have given rise to many a continuing increase in tollʼs duty that was detrimental to trade. Adelaide and her son, as it seems, sought satisfaction for the aforementioned debt of Emperor Charles IV to the toll of the Electorate of Mainz at Oberlahnstein, which was closest to them. In any case, they had even older claims on the Electorate of Mainz, probably dating back to Roman King Louis IVʼs time. As usual, a feud ensued. In the autumn of 1362, Archbishop , invaded Nassau-Siegen with 500 horsemen, each of whom, according to the custom of the time, were accompanied by a few armed footmen. The long known belligerent peasants of the Rheingau scorched, looted and devastated the county, but had to retreat across the Rhine when the floods came, to prevent being cut off. In December of the same year, Gerlach and John signed a peace treaty at Aschaffenburg. Gerlach promised to pay 3500 florins and to grant John a tornesel from the toll at Oberlahnstein until he would have drawn 2000 florins from it. Also in 1362, Adelaide handed over the reign to her eldest son.

Adelaide died on 30 September 1376. It is unknown where she was buried.

Legacy
When Elisabeth of Sponheim-Kreuznach, Countess of Vianden, died without issue in 1417, Adelaideʼs grandsons, Adolf I, John II ʻwith the Helmetʼ, Engelbert I and John III ʻthe Youngerʼ of Nassau-Siegen, inherited the County of Vianden with the lordships of St. Vith, Bütgenbach, Dasburg and Grimbergen. The King of the Netherlands still holds the titles Count of Vianden, Lord of St. Vith, Bütgenbach and Dasburg.

The coat of arms of the County of Vianden became the certification mark of the steel from Siegen, which was hammered as a trademark into the steel by blacksmiths for generations, and with that steel went around the world.

First marriage?
In his genealogy of the House of Nassau, A.W.E. Dek states that Adelaide was first married to Johan v. Dollendorf-Cronenberg. That marriage is not mentioned by A.A. Vorsterman van Oyen in his genealogy of the same house. On the website Medieval Lands, Charles Cawley, states that an incorrect interpretation of a charter dated 23 May 1356, led to the assumption that Adelaide had married firstly Johann von Dollendorf Herr zu Kronenberg.

Issue
From the marriage of Adelaide and Otto the following children were born:
 Count John I ( – Herborn Castle, 4 September 1416), succeeded his father as Count of Nassau-Siegen. He married on 30 November 1357 to Countess  (d. 29 September 1409).
 Henry ‘the Swashbuckler’ (d. Kassel, 5 September 1402), was canon at the Cologne Cathedral since 1356.
 Otto (d. 1384), was canon and provost of Saint Maurice Church in Mainz since 1357 and canon of the Cologne Cathedral and the Mainz Cathedral since 1380.

Adelaide and Otto signed a marriage contract with Count Adolf II of the Mark and Countess Margaret of Cleves, for a son of Nassau to marry a daughter of the Mark, on 14 August 1343.

The second son, Henry ‘the Swashbuckler’, although being a clergyman, was nevertheless a brutal fighter of his time, as the disconcerting epithet that his comrades gave him reveals. He even sometimes attacked his eldest brother John.

Ancestors

Notes

References

Sources
 
 
 
 
 
 
 
  (1882). Het vorstenhuis Oranje-Nassau. Van de vroegste tijden tot heden (in Dutch). Leiden: A.W. Sijthoff/Utrecht: J.L. Beijers.

External links

 Luxembourg, Salm – Grafen von Vianden. In: Medieval Lands. A prosopography of medieval European noble and royal families, by Charles Cawley.
 Nassau. In: Medieval Lands. A prosopography of medieval European noble and royal families, by Charles Cawley.
 Nassau Part 4. In: An Online Gotha, by Paul Theroff.

|-

|-

Vianden, Adelaide
Countesses of Nassau
German female regents
∞
House of Vianden
14th-century German nobility
14th-century Luxembourgian women
Year of birth unknown
14th-century women rulers